The lesser trochanter is a conical posteromedial bony projection of the femoral shaft. it serves as the principal insertion site of the iliopsoas muscle.

Structure
The lesser trochanter is a conical posteromedial projection of the shaft of the femur, projecting from the posteroinferior aspect of its junction with the femoral neck.

The summit and anterior surface of the lesser trochanter are rough, whereas its posterior surface is smooth.

From its apex three well-marked borders extend:
 two of these are above
 a medial continuous with the lower border of the femur neck
 a lateral with the intertrochanteric crest
 the inferior border is continuous with the middle division of the linea aspera

Attachments 
The summit of the lesser trochanter gives insertion to the tendon of the psoas major muscle and the iliacus muscle; the lesser trochanter represents the principal attachment of the iliopsoas.

Anatomical relations 
The intertrochanteric crest (which demarcates the junction of the femoral shaft and neck posteriorly) extends between the lesser trochanter and the greater trochanter on the posterior surface of the femur.

Clinical significance
The lesser trochanter can be involved in an avulsion fracture.

Other animals

Paleontology 
The position of the lesser trochanter close to the head of the femur is one of the defining characteristics of the Prozostrodontia, which is the clade of cynodonts including mammals and their closest non-mammaliform relatives. It was erected as a node-based taxon as the least inclusive clade containing Prozostrodon brasiliensis, Tritylodon langaevus, Pachygenelus monus, and Mus musculus (the house mouse).

All living mammals have a lesser trochanter, whose size, shape, and position is distinctive to their species.

Additional images

See also 

 Greater trochanter
 Third trochanter

References

External links
 
 

Bones of the lower limb
Femur